Pespatang-e Sofla (also Romanized as Pespatang-e Soflá; also known as Pespatang-e Pā’īn, Pas Petang-e Pā’īn, and Posht Tang-e Pā’īn) is a village in Baqeran Rural District, in the Central District of Birjand County, South Khorasan Province, Iran. At the 2006 census, its population was 10, in 4 families.

References 

Populated places in Birjand County